Herbert Frederick Lemp (June 24, 1884 – May 6, 1927) served briefly as mayor of Boise, Idaho, before his death in May 1927.

Lemp was elected mayor in April 1927 but was seriously injured in a polo accident shortly thereafter. Lemp was sworn in as mayor in the hospital but succumbed to his injuries four days later. His term was completed by Walter F. Hansen.

References

Sources
Mayors of Boise - Past and Present
Idaho State Historical Society Reference Series, Corrected List of Mayors, 1867-1996

1884 births
1927 deaths
Mayors of Boise, Idaho
Polo deaths
20th-century American politicians
Sports deaths in Idaho